The Constitutional Democratic Party (PDC) was a social-liberal political party in Italy.

The party emerged in 1913 from the left-wing of the dominant Liberals, of which it continued to be a government coalition partner. In the 1913 general election the party, which was rooted in Southern Italy while in the North it often presented joint candidates with the Liberals, won 4.8% of the vote and 40 seats in the Chamber of Deputies. In 1919 the PDC was merged with other liberal parties and groupings in the Social Democracy, that gained 10.9% and 60 seats in the 1919 general election, while other Democrats joined Liberal–Radical joint lists.

Electoral results

References

See also
 Liberalism and radicalism in Italy

Liberal parties in Italy
Defunct political parties in Italy
Social liberal parties
1913 establishments in Italy
1919 disestablishments in Italy
Political parties established in 1913
Political parties disestablished in 1919